Perissomastix is a genus of moths belonging to the family Tineidae.

Species
Some species of this genus are:
Perissomastix afghana  Petersen, 1959
Perissomastix acutibasis 	Gozmány, 1968
Perissomastix adamasta 	(Meyrick, 1909)
Perissomastix agenjoi 	(Petersen, 1957)
Perissomastix amseli  Petersen, 1959
Perissomastix asiriella  Petersen & Gaedike, 1982
Perissomastix atlantis  Zagulajev, 1975
Perissomastix atricoma  Meyrick, 1931
Perissomastix bergeri 	Gozmány, 1967
Perissomastix bifurcatella  Petersen, 1957
Perissomastix biskraella 	(Rebel, 1901)
Perissomastix breviberbis 	(Meyrick, 1933)	
Perissomastix caryocephala 	(Meyrick, 1937)	
Perissomastix catapulta 	Gozmány, 1968
Perissomastix christinae 	Gozmány, 1965
Perissomastix cornuta  Petersen, 1959
Perissomastix crassicornella 	Agenjo, 1952
Perissomastix damnificella 	(Zeller, 1852)
Perissomastix dentifera 	Gozmány & Vári, 1973
Perissomastix falcata  Petersen, 1988
Perissomastix flava 	(Petersen, 1960)
Perissomastix fulvicoma 	(Meyrick, 1921)
Perissomastix gabori 	Gozmány, 1967
Perissomastix gibi 	Gozmány, 1965
Perissomastix gozmanyi  Capuse, 1971
Perissomastix hirundinea  Meyrick, 1928
Perissomastix hogasi  Capuse, 1971
Perissomastix holopsamma 	(Meyrick, 1908)
Perissomastix idolatrix 	Gozmány & Vári, 1973
Perissomastix jemenitica 	Gaedike, 2014
Perissomastix lala 	Gozmány, 1967
Perissomastix lucifer 	Gozmány, 1965
Perissomastix madagascarica 	Gozmány, 1969
Perissomastix marcescens 	(Meyrick, 1908)
Perissomastix mascherata 	Gozmány, 1965
Perissomastix melanops 	Gozmány, 1967
Perissomastix meretrix 	(Meyrick, 1908)	
Perissomastix meruicola 	Gozmány, 1969
Perissomastix mili 	Gozmány, 1965
Perissomastix montis 	Gozmány, 1968
Perissomastix mucrapex 	Gozmány, 1968
Perissomastix nigerica 	Gozmány, 1967
Perissomastix nigriceps Warren & Rothschild, 1905
Perissomastix nigrocephala  Petersen, 1982
Perissomastix nox 	Gozmány, 1968
Perissomastix onyx 	Gozmány, 1966
Perissomastix othello 	(Meyrick, 1907)
Perissomastix palaestinella  Amsel 1956
Perissomastix pantsa 	Gozmány, 1967
Perissomastix pauliani 	Gozmány, 1970
Perissomastix peltiger 	Mey, 2011
Perissomastix perdita 	Gozmány, 1965
Perissomastix perlata 	Gozmány, 1967
Perissomastix peterseni  Amsel, 1959
Perissomastix praxis 	Gozmány, 1969
Perissomastix protaxia 	(Meyrick, 1924)
Perissomastix pyroxantha 	(Meyrick, 1914)	
Perissomastix recurvata 	Gozmány, 1968
Perissomastix ruwenzorica 	Gozmány & Vári, 1973
Perissomastix sericea 	Gozmány, 1966
Perissomastix similatrix 	Gozmány, 1968
Perissomastix stibarodes 	(Meyrick, 1908)
Perissomastix styx 	Gozmány, 1966
Perissomastix szunyoghyi 	Gozmány, 1969
Perissomastix taeniaecornis 	(Walsingham, 1896)
Perissomastix tihamaella 	Petersen & Gaedike, 1982
Perissomastix titanea 	Gozmány, 1967
Perissomastix topaz Gozmány, 1967
Perissomastix varii 	Gozmány, 1967
Perissomastix versicolor   Gaedike, 2009
Perissomastix wadimaidaq 	Gaedike, 2009
Perissomastix wiltshirella  (Petersen, 1964)
Perissomastix zernyi  Petersen, 1957

References

Perissomasticinae
Tineidae genera